Fukutake may refer to:

 Fukutake Publishing, now Benesse
 Soichiro Fukutake (born 1945), Japanese billionaire